Burn or Bury is the second studio album by Milk Cult, released on October 23, 1994, by Priority Records. It features contributions from numerous guests, including: Mike Patton and Billy Gould of Faith No More; Blake Schwarzenbach of Jawbreaker; Lars Fox and Bruce Boyd of Grotus; Dave Edwardson, Scott Kelly and Steve Von Till of Neurosis; Mark Davies of Thinking Fellers Union Local 282; and Carla Bozulich of The Geraldine Fibbers.

Track listing

Personnel
Adapted from the Burn or Bury liner notes.

Milk Cult
 Dale Flattum (as C.C. Nova) – bass guitar, loops, electric guitar (7)
 Eric Holland (as Conko) – electronics
 Mike Morasky (as The Bumblebee) – sampler, electronics

Production
 Brian Gardner – mastering

Additional musicians

 Bruce Boyd (as Juice) – loops
 Carla Bozulich – vocals (8)
 Mark Davies – vocals (6)
 Dave Edwardson – vocals (3)
 Lars Fox – vocals (5)
 Mami Fukuya – violin (10)
 Billy Gould – bass guitar (3)
 Matt Heckert – loops (11)
 Scott Kelly – vocals (3)
 Bob McDonald (as El Bobo D'Amour) – vocals (9)
 Hidekazu Miyahara – vocals (2)
 Darren Morey (as D.K. Mor-X) – drums, percussion
 Masaya Nakahara – vocals (2)
 Mike Patton – vocals (1)
 Paul Reller – saxophone (2)
 Sheeba – vocals (2)
 Blake Schwarzenbach – vocals and electric guitar (4)
 Steve Von Till – vocals (3)

Release history

References

External links 
 

1994 albums
Milk Cult albums
Priority Records albums